Ricardo Jorge Silva Pinto Pereira (born 4 March 1981 in Porto), known as Joca, is a Portuguese retired professional footballer who played as a defensive midfielder.

External links

1981 births
Living people
Footballers from Porto
Portuguese footballers
Association football midfielders
Primeira Liga players
Liga Portugal 2 players
Segunda Divisão players
FC Porto B players
FC Porto players
Vitória F.C. players
Gil Vicente F.C. players
C.D. Santa Clara players
U.D. Oliveirense players
S.C. Espinho players
S.C. Dragões Sandinenses players
Football League (Greece) players
Ethnikos Piraeus F.C. players
Qingdao Hainiu F.C. (1990) players
Cypriot First Division players
Cypriot Second Division players
AEL Limassol players
Ermis Aradippou FC players
PAEEK players
Segunda División B players
Lorca Atlético CF players
Dhofar Club players
Portugal youth international footballers
Portugal under-21 international footballers
Portuguese expatriate footballers
Expatriate footballers in Greece
Expatriate footballers in China
Expatriate footballers in Cyprus
Expatriate footballers in Spain
Expatriate footballers in Oman
Portuguese expatriate sportspeople in Greece
Portuguese expatriate sportspeople in China
Portuguese expatriate sportspeople in Cyprus
Portuguese expatriate sportspeople in Spain
Portuguese expatriate sportspeople in Oman